Tetralimonius quercus is a species of click beetle belonging to the family Elateridae, formerly placed in the genus Pheletes.

Description
Adults can be found from late-April until June, feeding on grass, herbaceous plants and shrubs.

Distribution and habitat
This species is present in most of Europe, Siberia and the Near East. Its habitat is lowlands and hilly regions, especially in dry and sunny areas.

References

External links
 Meloidae

Elateridae
Beetles described in 1790
Dendrometrinae